Typhoon Rita, known in the Philippines as Typhoon Kading, was the most powerful tropical cyclone during the 1978 Pacific typhoon season and one of the most intense tropical cyclones on record. A long-lived and destructive tropical cyclone, Rita began its journey east of the Marshall Islands and rapidly moved westwards, becoming a typhoon on October 20. Rita struck the Philippines overnight on October 26 and entered the South China Sea as a minimal typhoon. Rita caused extreme damage and more than 300 deaths.

Meteorological history

Rita originated from a tropical depression that originated east of the Marshall Islands, near the International Date Line, on October 17. Rita continued rapid intensification and became a Category 4-equivalent super typhoon on October 23.

Rita continued to move westward and late in the evening of the same day, Rita passed  of Guam, where heavy damages to banana plantations were reported. Satellite pictures received later in the afternoon revealed a distinct eye and good cirrus outflow associated with the circulation of Rita. During the following night, on October 26, Rita made landfall over Luzon, causing disastrous damage and leaving 200,000 homeless. Baler, located on the east coast of Luzon, reported gusts of  when the storm passed just to the south of it.

Rita entered the South China Sea on October 27 and gradually accelerated in speed as it moved west-northwest towards Hainan. Its circulation remained intense with a large area of strong winds even though it weakened significantly after striking the Philippines. Since an intense surge of winter monsoon was expected to reach the Southern Chinese coast. The combinations of the effects of Rita and the monsoon were forecast to cause strong winds in Hong Kong overnight.

Due to the influx of cold and dry air because the winter monsoon, the typhoon weakened rapidly and moved slowly southwestwards away from Hong Kong. during daytime on October 28. On October 29, satellites received unveiled that the system became disorganized and the center of the system ill-defined. The monsoon still caused gale-forced winds over the South China Sea even though Rita had moved away from Hong Kong and weakened into a weak tropical storm. Rita continued to weaken and degenerated into an area of low pressure, off the coast of South Vietnam, on October 29.

Preparations and impact

Before approaching the Philippines, flights to Guam were all canceled and U.S. Strategic Air Command evacuated all of its B-52 bombers to Kadena Air Base in Okinawa and naval aircraft were sent to Cubi Point in the Philippines.

While approaching the Philippines, authorities had all aircraft evacuated to Guam and Okinawa. All international flights in and out of Manila Airport were canceled. Philippine Airlines scrubbed all domestic flights and its airplanes were evacuated to the Southern Philippines. Schools and businesses in Manila and most of northern Luzon were closed.

Guam
In Guam, no major damage was reported even though there was crop damage that was not immediately determined. 2 U.S. Navy personnel were killed and a third was injured while taking an antenna from a building during preparations from Rita. The antenna came in contact with a high-voltage wire. 7 people were injured, 4 seriously injured in a head-on auto collision. Investigators reported that the road was wet and that there were wind gusts at the time of the collision. A civilian suffered multiple injuries when he fell from the sixth floor of an apartment building where he was boarding up windows. His condition is not immediately known.

Philippines
There were no immediate reports of casualties or damage in northern Luzon. However, Luzon was pounded by Rita's violent  wind gusts and extremely torrential rains. Red Cross and national disaster officials reported that more than 4,000 people were moved to safer ground and evacuation continued. A youth was reported to be electrocuted by a falling wire near the capital and a Luzon couple was seriously injured when a tree fell on their house. Power lines in many provinces were toppled. Death toll from the storm was reported to have risen to more than 200 on October 31. A reported 354 other Filipinos were missing. The storm cut across rice-rich fields of the Central Luzon plains with  winds. More than 50,000 homes were destroyed and displaced 291,610 families, a total of 1,444,465 people. Damage to infrastructure and agricultural crops was placed at more than $100 million (1979 USD) and about 750,000 acres of rice was damaged. President Ferdinand E. Marcos declared 5 provinces calamity zones. He later ordered the suspension of the exporting of rice as a result of the extensive damage. Some areas experienced flooding that was waist-deep. It was reported that a Red Cross team sent to check reported that a dam had overflown and drowned 30 villagers outside the town of Norzagaray. In the Norzagaray area, 18 people were reported dead and 24 others missing. In the Angat area, where the Angat Dam is located, 6 people were dead and 20 were missing. U.S. Navy planes and helicopters saved 40 crewmen from a wrecked Moroccan ship that sunk in the South China Sea. It had blown there by the typhoon's powerful winds and high seas. Super Typhoon Rita was the worst typhoon to strike the Philippines in 8 years since Super Typhoon Joan in 1970.

See also

Typhoon Nora (1973)
Typhoon Joan (1970)
Typhoon Tip

Notes

References

Typhoons in the Philippines
1978 Pacific typhoon season
Typhoons